Eau de toilette (meaning "grooming water") is a lightly scented perfume. It is also referred to as aromatic waters and has a high alcohol content. It is usually applied directly to the skin after bathing or shaving. It is traditionally composed of alcohol and various volatile oils. Traditionally these products were named after a principal ingredient; some being geranium water, lavender water, lilac water, violet water, spirit of myrcia and 'eau de Bretfeld'. Because of this, eau de toilette was sometimes referred to as "toilet water".

In modern perfumery, eau de toilette has less concentrated fragrance than perfume (eau de parfum) and more than cologne (eau de Cologne).

Types   

Eau de toilette is a weaker concentration of fragrance than perfume. The concentration of aromatic ingredients is typically as follows (ascending concentration):
 Splash and after shave: 1–3% aromatic compounds
 Eau de Cologne (EdC): Citrus type perfumes with about 2–6% perfume concentrate aromatic compounds
 Eau de toilette (EdT): 5–15% (typical ~10%) aromatic compounds
 Eau de parfum (EdP), parfum de toilette (PdT): 10–20% (typical ~15%) aromatic compounds. Sometimes listed as "eau de perfume" or "millésime".
 Perfume extract: 15–40% (IFRA: typical 20%) aromatic compounds

Perfume oils are often diluted with a solvent, though this is not always the case, and its necessity is disputed. By far the most common solvent for perfume oil dilution is ethanol or a mixture of ethanol and water. Perfume has a mixture of about 10–20% perfume oils mixed with alcohol (acting as a diffusing agent delivering the fragrant odor) and a trace of water. Colognes have about 3–5% perfume oil mixed with 80–90% alcohol with about 5–15% water in the mix. Originally, eau de cologne was a mixture of citrus oils from such fruits as lemons, oranges, tangerines, limes, and grapefruits. These were combined with such substances as lavender and neroli (orange-flower oil). Toilet water has the least amount of perfume oil mixture among the three main liquid "perfumery" categories. It has only about 2–8% of some type of perfume oil and 60–80% alcohol dispersent with water making up the difference. Toilet waters are a less concentrated form of these above types of alcohol-based perfumes. Traditionally cologne is usually made of citrus oils and fragrances, while toilet waters are not limited to this specification.

History   
Hungarian Eau de toilette, an alcohol based perfume that is the predecessor of eau de cologne, was first produced in the fourteenth century, supposedly by a Hungarian man for Queen Elisabeth of Hungary. This toilet water was called "eau de la reine de hongrie" or Hungary Water, and contained the herb rosemary, which allowed the scent to evaporate slowly on the skin. However, some early scientists, including Johann Beckmann, doubt that it was created for the Queen of Hungary.

The King of France Louis XIV (1638–1715) used a concoction of scents called "heavenly water" to perfume his shirts; It consisted of aloewood, musk, orange flower, rose water and other spices.

Some Eau de toilette were once considered restorative skin toners with medical benefits. The journal Medical Record reported in 1905 that a toilet water spray restores energies lost in business, social, and domestic situations. During the fourteenth through sixteenth centuries a type of toilet water called "plague waters" was supposed to drive away the bubonic plague.

Varieties
 Carmelite Water – a water of lemon balm, orange flower, angelica root, and spices prepared for Charles V of France, first made in 1379 by the nuns of a Carmelite abbey.
 Carnation Toilet Water – extract of Jasmine 2.5 pints, extract of Orange Flower 2.5 pints, extract of Rose 5 pints, tincture of Vanilla 20 ounces, Oil of Pink (synthetic) 2 ounces.
 Creole Toilet Water – to 6.75 ounces of orris root cut in small pieces put 1.5 pint of French brandy. Allow this mix to stand for 2 weeks, stirring frequently. Then filter the mix and add 3 pints of French brandy and 3 drops of oil of orange blossoms. Add 0.75 fluid ounce of oil of geranium. Distill and add a little coumarin essence.
 Eau de lavand ambre – a favorite with Spanish women who use it in their hair as well as on the skin after bathing.
 Florida Water – based on the nineteenth-century formula for a commercially prepared toilet water that mixes floral essential oils.
 Geranium Toilet Water – oil of rose geranium, 2 ounces; tincture of orris root, 2 ounces; tincture of musk, 1 drop; rose water, 8 ounces: alcohol, 4 pints.
 Heliotrope Toilet Water – heliotropine, 2 drops; rose oil, 15 minims; bergamot oil, a half drop; neroli oil, 5 minims; alcohol, 10 ounces; water, 6 ounces.
 Honey water – an old-time English toilet water. The British Pharmaceutical Codex gives the formula.
 Jasmine toilet water – made with spirits of cologne, jasmine, and alcohol.
 Kananga Water – is a "holy water" used for purification in revival ceremonies.
 Lavender water – a formula called "upper Ten" consists of 1 fluid ounce of oil of lavender, 8 fluid ounces of deodorized alcohol, 3 fluid ounces of rose water, and 80 grains of carbonate of magnesia.
 Nosegay – distilled honey water with cloves, lavender and neroli.
 Oriental Toilet Water – an extensive list of ingredients is given in the Useful and Practical Notes section of National Druggist.
 Rose water toilet water – extract of rose 1 pint, of tuberose 1 pint, of cassia 1 pint, of jasmine 4 ounces, tincture of civet 3 ounces.  Popular in the Middle East especially Egypt and called 'maward'.
 Viennese Cosmetic Toilet Water – bruised almonds, 15 parts; water of orange flower, 62 parts; water of roses, 62 parts. Rub up the almonds with the waters, allow to stand. Later add borate of soda, 1 part; spirit of benzoin, 2 parts. Dissolve.
 White Rose Toilet Water – one ounce of triple extract of white rose, 3 drops of oil of rose, 3 drops of oil of rose geranium, 26 ounces of cologne spirits, and 6 ounces of hot water.
 Hugh C. Muldoonin submitted various toilet water formulas he called "Own-make Toilet Specialties" to the Bulletin Of Pharmacy in 1917.

See also
Scented water

Footnotes

References

Sources 
 Beckmann, Johann, A History of Inventions and Discoveries: In Four Volumes 2, 1817
 Baker, William Henry, A dictionary of men's wear..., W. H. Baker, 1908
 Better Nutrition magazine, Nov 1999, Vol. 61, No. 11, ISSN 0405-668X, Published by Active Interest Media, Inc.
 Booth, Nancy M., Perfumes, splashes & colognes: discovering & crafting your personal fragrances, Storey Publishing, 1997, 
 Bulletin of pharmacy, Volume 36, E.G. Swift, 1922
 Beauty—its attainment and preservation, Butterick Pub. Co., Ltd., 1892
 Consumer reports, Volumes 25–26, Consumers Union of United States, 1960
 Cox, Nancy C., Perceptions of retailing in early modern England, Ashgate Publishing, Ltd., 2007, 
 Cristiani, Richard S., Perfumery and kindred arts: A comprehensive treatise on perfumery, H. C. Baird, 1877
 Current opinion, Volume 32, The Current Literature Publishing Co., 1902
 Dewey, Willis Alonzo, Medical century, Volume 14, Medical Century Company., 1906
 Ebert, Albert Ethelbert, The Standard formulary, G.P. Engelhard & Co., 1897
 Fettner, Ann Tucker, Potpourri, incense, and other fragrant concoctions, Workman Pub. Co., 1977, 
 Fletcher, Ella Adelia, Woman Beautiful, Kessinger Publishing, 1998, 
 Frank, Marc Henry, Eugenics and Sex Relations for Men and Women, Kessinger Publishing, 2005, 
 Griffin, Judy, Flowers That Heal: Aromas, Herbs, Essences and Other Secrets of the Fairies, Cosimo, Inc., 2002, 
 Grolier, The New book of knowledge, Grolier, 1986, 
 Groom, Nigel, The new perfume handbook, Springer, 1997, 
 Halpern, Georges M., The Healing Trail: Essential Oils of Madagascar, Basic Health Publications, Inc., 2003, 
 Hiss, A. Emil, The new standard formulary:, G.P. Engelhard, 1910
 Keithler, William R., The formulation of cosmetics and cosmetic specialties, Drug and Cosmetic Industry, 1956
 Hopkins, Albert Allis, The Scientific American cyclopedia of formulas: partly based upon the 28th ed. of Scientific American cyclopedia of receipts, notes and queries, Munn & co., inc., 1910
 Lawless, Julia, The illustrated encyclopedia of essential oils: the complete guide to the use of oils in aromatherapy and herbalism, Barnes & Noble, 1995, 
 Lillard, Benjamin, Practical druggist and pharmaceutical review of reviews, Volume 40, Lillard & Co., 1922
 Martin, George R., The mentor-world traveler, Volume 10, George R. Martin, 1922
 Miller, William Tyler, Garden & home builder, volume 13, Doubleday, Page and Company, 1911
 Müller, Peter M., Perfumes: art, science, and technology, Springer, 1994, 
 Sherrow, Victoria, For appearance' sake: the historical encyclopedia of good looks, beauty, and grooming, Greenwood Publishing Group, 2001, 
 Stoddart, David Michael, The scented ape: the biology and culture of human odour, Cambridge University Press, 1990, 
 The National Druggist, Volume 42; H. R. Strong, 1912

Citations

Toiletry
Perfumery
Economy of Cologne
Perfumes
Personal hygiene products

de:Parfüm#Verdünnungsklassen